Darren Irwin Anderson (born 6 September 1966) is an English former professional footballer who played as a central defender in the Football League. He represented England at youth level.

After a League career in which Anderson played for Charlton Athletic, Crewe Alexandra and Aldershot, he joined Conference side Slough Town, where he made 137 appearances and scored 16 goals. He left for Sutton United in September 1993.

References

External links

1966 births
Living people
English footballers
Association football defenders
Charlton Athletic F.C. players
Crewe Alexandra F.C. players
Aldershot F.C. players
Slough Town F.C. players
Sutton United F.C. players

English Football League players